"Ain't Thinkin' 'Bout You" is a song by rapper Bow Wow. featuring Chris Brown. An early version originally appeared on Brown's collaborative mixtape with Tyga, Fan of a Fan.

Music video

Synopsis
The music video premiered on October 30, 2010, via World Star Hip Hop. The video begins with Bow Wow reading a letter from his fiancé, breaking off their engagement. It continues with other scenes from their relationship, including the proposal, and Brown and Bow Wow partying poolside and singing on a brick road. Birdman  makes an appearance in the video. The video was directed by Colin Tilley.

Reception 
BET placed the music video at #75 on its Notarized: Top 100 Videos of 2010 countdown.

Charts

References

2010 singles
Bow Wow (rapper) songs
Chris Brown songs
Songs written by Bow Wow (rapper)
Cash Money Records singles
Music videos directed by Colin Tilley
2010 songs
Songs written by Kevin McCall